The Franklin County Courthouse in Hampton, Iowa, United States was built in 1891. It was individually listed on the National Register of Historic Places in 1976 as a part of the County Courthouses in Iowa Thematic Resource. In 2003 it was included as a contributing property in the Hampton Double Square Historic District. The courthouse is the third facility to house court functions and county administration.

History
Initially, Franklin County business was enacted in the home of Judge James B. Reeve. County commissioners selected a place called Jefferson as the county seat in deference to Judge Reeve who was from Jefferson, Ohio. However, one county commissioner disagreed with the proposal, and with the support of county citizens, Hampton became the county seat. Commissioners constructed a single-story frame building in 1857 to serve as the first courthouse. They later sold it to a church, which used it as a home. It was later used as a stable. County records were kept at a school until a new courthouse built of stone was constructed in the middle of the square. It measured  and cost $12,500. The present Romanesque Revival building, by Minneapolis architect T.D. Allen, was completed in 1891 at a cost of $60,000. The courthouse is a fine example of the Romanesque Revival style popular in the late 19th century. It was built during a transitional period of county government that saw movement from simple utilitarian structures to more elaborate structures that reflected the need for more space and bestowed a sense of dignity to its work.

Architecture
The courthouse is a two-story brick structure built over a raised basement. It is roughly rectangular in shape, and measures . The high foundation of the building and surround of the large round-arch main entrance is composed of rusticated stone. All of the windows feature stone ornamentation with rusticated stone surrounds on the first-floor windows. The building also features a machicolated cornice and clusters of circular chimneys. It is capped with a hipped roof and a tall domed clock tower. The tower itself has a four-faced clock and a statue of a classical figure at each corner of the bell chamber. A statue of Lady Justice is on top of the dome.

References

Government buildings completed in 1891
Romanesque Revival architecture in Iowa
Hampton, Iowa
Buildings and structures in Franklin County, Iowa
Courthouses on the National Register of Historic Places in Iowa
County courthouses in Iowa
Clock towers in Iowa
National Register of Historic Places in Franklin County, Iowa
Individually listed contributing properties to historic districts on the National Register in Iowa
1891 establishments in Iowa